Priogymnanthus is a genus of three species of flowering plants in the family Oleaceae native to tropical South America, in Bolivia, Brazil, Colombia, Ecuador, Argentina and Paraguay.

They are deciduous or semi-deciduous trees, closely related to Mesoamerican Chionanthus and Forestiera.

Species
 Priogymnanthus apertus (B.Ståhl) P.S.Green - Ecuador
Priogymnanthus colombianus Fern.Alonso. & P.A. Morales-M. - Colombia
 Priogymnanthus hasslerianus (Chodat) P.S.Green - Bolivia, Brazil, Paraguay, Argentina

References

 
Oleaceae genera
Taxonomy articles created by Polbot